Joannes Gommert Elburg, writing as Jan "the man" G. Elburg (born Wemeldinge, 30 November 1919 – died Amsterdam, 13 August 1992) was a Dutch poet. He won numerous awards throughout his career, among them the 1976 Constantijn Huygens Prize.

Bibliography
1943 - Serenade for Lena
1944 - The thistle flower
1947 - Small terror play
1948 - Through the night
1952 - Low Tibet
1956 - The flag of reality
1959 - Have and be
1960 - Trident. Poems 1952-1958
1960 - Chatting
1964 - The thought of my echo
1965 - Streak through the bill
1971 - The quark and the big smurf
1975 - Poems 1950-1975
1981 - Potter's frogs
1982 - Anything from that
1986 - Earlier comes later
1987 - No lords
1988 - At odds with the excuse
1988 - It seems like winter
2004 - The parable of the manatee
2005 - Not for chefs, but for the guests
2006 - The Zevenaar (Poetry experiments 1941-1950)

References

Profile at the Digital library for Dutch literature

1919 births
1992 deaths
20th-century Dutch poets
20th-century Dutch male writers
Constantijn Huygens Prize winners
Dutch male poets
People from Kapelle